Reginald D. Root was an American football and men's lacrosse coach at Yale University.

He served as the men's lacrosse coach for two stints, first during the 1929–1930 to 1930–1931 seasons and later during the 1936–1937 to 1942–1943 seasons while compiling a record of 42–27–1.  He also served as head football coach in 1933, compiling a record of 4–4.

Head coaching record

Men's lacrosse

† Competed as an independent

Football

References

Year of birth missing
Year of death missing
Yale Bulldogs football coaches
Yale Bulldogs men's lacrosse coaches